CORE, sometimes referred to as the CORE Group Marketing LLC, is a New York-based, full-service real estate brokerage firm.

History
CORE was founded in 2005 by Jack Cayre (the son of real estate developer and music and video executive Joseph Cayre) and South African immigrant Shaun Osher, an acronym for Cayre Osher Real Estate. CORE consists of over 170 real estate professionals and staff with offices in Chelsea, Flatiron, Union Square, Madison Avenue and Brooklyn. CORE has generated over $5 billion in sales and marketed and sold over 30 new development projects.

In March 2010, The Real Deal announced CORE’s participation in the HGTV reality show, Selling New York.

In 2014, Related Companies acquired a stake in CORE to further expand the firm's brand and offerings throughout New York City.

References

External links
CORE website

Real estate services companies of the United States
Real estate companies established in 2005
Companies based in Manhattan